The St George and Sutherland Shire Leader is an Australian Community Media-owned community newspaper distributed in the southern Sydney region. It currently has a monthly readership of 423,832 people and caters for the St George and Sutherland areas.

History
The paper was first published on Wednesday, 29 June 1960, as a weekly publication. It was formed as a merger of smaller local newspapers: The Times, The Express, The District and Shire News and The Kingsgrove Riverwood Courier.

By 1961, the newspaper had a circulation of 81,000 free weekly copies and sold another 1,000. It ranged in size from 48 to 56 pages. It employed two sub-editors, four reporters, one photographer, a columnist and used outside contributors.

In 1984, the Leader moved to a twice-weekly publication on Tuesdays and Thursdays. On December 16, 2015, the paper reverted to a weekly publication on Wednesdays.

References

External links
 The Leader - Website

St George (Sydney)
Sutherland Shire
Newspapers published in Sydney
1960 establishments in Australia